Dieter Glemser (born 1938 in Stuttgart) is a former touring car racing driver from Stuttgart, Germany.
He started his career in the early 1960s in rallying with a Porsche 356 and
In 1963 he won the Rally Poland with a Mercedes-Benz 220SE.

Overview 
In circuit racing, he became very successful in the early 1970s for Ford:
 1971 winner European Touring Car Championship
 1971 winner 24 Hours Spa
 1971 Guia Race at the Macau Grand Prix in a Ford Capri 2600RS
 1972 24 Hours of Le Mans 11th overall with a Ford Capri 2600RS
 1973 Deutsche Rennsport Meisterschaft with Zakspeed Racing Ford Escort
 1974 Deutsche Rennsport Meisterschaft with Zakspeed Racing Ford Escort.
Glemser also drove one time in Australia, partnering then 3-time and defending race winner Allan Moffat in Moffat's V8 powered Ford XB Falcon GT Hardtop in the 1974 Hardie-Ferodo 1000 at the Mount Panorama Circuit. After numerous engine and transmission troubles in practice (which saw them qualify in 15th) and again in the race, the Falcon was retired from the 163 lap race on lap 92. The Allan Moffat Racing team had gone into the race as favourites after Moffat easily won the traditional lead up event to Bathurst, the Sandown 250 just one month earlier.

External links
 Complete racing results
 https://web.archive.org/web/20050909083855/http://www.solitude-memorial.de/srmag/chap02/chap02hons.htm#ancGlemser

German racing drivers
Living people
24 Hours of Le Mans drivers
24 Hours of Spa drivers
Racing drivers from Baden-Württemberg
Sportspeople from Stuttgart
World Sportscar Championship drivers
European Touring Car Championship drivers
1938 births

Porsche Motorsports drivers